Nana-Yaw Gydeu Amankwah-Mensah (born 19 January 1989) is a footballer who plays as a midfielder.

Born in the United States, he represents Belize at international level.

Early and personal life
Born in New York City, Mensah is of Ghanaian and Belizean descent.

Career
Mensah has played club football for Çatalcaspor, Yalovaspor, Bornova 1881 Spor and Belediye Bingölspor. 

He made his international debut for Belize in 2015.

References

1989 births
Living people
People with acquired Belizean citizenship
Belizean footballers
Association football midfielders
Çatalcaspor players
Yalovaspor footballers
Belize international footballers
Belizean expatriate footballers
Belizean expatriate sportspeople in Turkey
Expatriate footballers in Turkey
Belizean people of Ghanaian descent
American soccer players
American expatriate soccer players
American expatriate sportspeople in Belize
American expatriate sportspeople in Turkey
American people of Belizean descent
American sportspeople of Ghanaian descent
Premier League of Belize players
Soccer players from New York City
Morris Elite SC players
USL League Two players
Michigan Stars FC players
Greek American AA players